Seyed Morad Mohammadi Pahnehkalaei (born April 9, 1980 in Sari, Mazandaran) is an Iranian wrestler and an Olympic bronze medalist who competed in the 2006 Asian Games in the 60 kg division and won the gold medal.

External links
 
 
 

1980 births
Living people
Iranian male sport wrestlers
Olympic wrestlers of Iran
Wrestlers at the 2008 Summer Olympics
Olympic bronze medalists for Iran
Asian Games gold medalists for Iran
Olympic medalists in wrestling
Asian Games medalists in wrestling
Wrestlers at the 2006 Asian Games
People from Sari, Iran
Medalists at the 2008 Summer Olympics
World Wrestling Championships medalists
Medalists at the 2006 Asian Games
Sportspeople from Sari, Iran
Asian Wrestling Championships medalists
21st-century Iranian people
20th-century Iranian people
World Wrestling Champions